Alberto Filippini (born 10 April 1987) is an Italian footballer who plays for Eccellenza club PortoMansuè.

Biography

Atalanta
Born in Brescia, Lombardy, Filippini started his career at another Lombard club Atalanta, which based in Bergamo. Filippini made his professional debut on 21 August 2005, against Siena in 2005–06 Coppa Italia. He was a substitute of Andrea Soncin.

Filippini also played for the reserve team of Atalanta from 2004 to 2006. From 2006 to 2008, Filippini was loaned to four Serie C1 clubs, namely Salernitana (with Bergamelli), Sassuolo, Venezia and Manfredonia (with Mandorlini from Venice).

Padova
In summer 2008 Padova signed Filippini in a temporary deal, as his fifth Serie C1 club. The club won promotion to Serie B in 2009. In June 2009 Filippini was signed by Padova in a co-ownership deal in a 3-year contract. Padova also signed his ex-Atalanta team-mate Andrea Soncin in August 2009, who also plays as a forward.

On 1 February 2010 Filippini returned to the third level of Italian football for Calcio Como, as his sixth Serie C1 club. In June 2010 Padova acquired him outright for free.

Return to Lega Pro
In the second half of 2010–11 Serie B season, Filippini returned to Calcio Como again in a temporary deal. In July 2011 Filippini was sold to Como outright for free.

On 21 January 2012 Filippini was signed by Cremonese, his seventh Serie C1 club.

Since 2013 Filippini had played for Torres (his first Serie C2 club), SPAL, Pordenone and Cosenza.

References

External links
 AIC profile (data by football.it) 
 

1987 births
Living people
Association football forwards
Footballers from Brescia
Italian footballers
Atalanta B.C. players
U.S. Salernitana 1919 players
U.S. Sassuolo Calcio players
Venezia F.C. players
Manfredonia Calcio players
Calcio Padova players
Como 1907 players
U.S. Cremonese players
S.P.A.L. players
Pordenone Calcio players
Cosenza Calcio players
S.E.F. Torres 1903 players
Alma Juventus Fano 1906 players
Serie B players
Serie C players
Serie D players